The Power of Love is an American silent drama film and the first 3D feature film worldwide. The premiere was on September 27, 1922, at the Ambassador Hotel Theater in Los Angeles.

The 3D version of the film is presumed lost. The film was later shown in 2D as Forbidden Lover. This 2-D version is also believed lost.

Plot
Don Almeda promises his daughter Maria to Don Alvarez because of his financial trouble. Maria does not love Don Alvarez and falls in love with Terry O'Neal. He is a stranger who has been wounded by robbers associated with Alvarez and later he takes Alvarez's place at a masquerade ball. Alvarez robs an old padre of some pearls and stabs him with O'Neal's knife and accuses O'Neal of the murder. Alvarez tries to shoot him, but wounds Maria instead, because she has thrown herself in front of him. Maria recovers and after proving that Alvarez is a thief and a killer, marries O'Neal.

Cast
 Elliot Sparling as Terry O'Neal
 Barbara Bedford as Maria Almeda
 Noah Beery as Don Almeda
 Aileen Manning as Ysabel Almeda
 Albert Prisco as Don Alvarez
 John Herdman as The Old Padre

Background
The film utilized the red-and-green anaglyph system for the 3D experience and also gave the audience the option of viewing one of two different endings to the film (in 2D) by looking through only the red or green lens of the spectacles, depending on whether the viewer wanted to see a happy or tragic ending. The Power of Love is the only film released in the two-camera, two-projector Fairall-Elder stereoscopic format developed by Harry K. Fairall and Robert F. Elder.

Reception
The film was not a success in 3D and was only screened one time again in this version for exhibitors and press in New York City. The film received a decent review in Moving Picture World. Despite other rave reviews, it was not booked again by other exhibitors in this format.

In July 1923, the film was acquired by the new Selznick Distributing Corporation and widely distributed in 2D as Forbidden Lover in 1923–24.

References

External links

 
 
 The Power of Love at silentera.com
 
 Forbidden Lover at silentera.com

American silent feature films
American black-and-white films
1922 films
1920s 3D films
Haworth Pictures Corporation films
Lost American films
1922 lost films
1920s American films